The Daily Sangram, also known as Dainik Sangram ( Doinik Shônggram "Daily Struggle") is a Pro-Jamaat-e-Islami Bengali daily newspaper published from Dhaka, Bangladesh. The name of the editor is Abul Asad, who is also the writer of the popular fiction series, the Saimum Series. The Daily Sangram publishes both Bangladesh and international news as well as local and regional perspectives. It also provides entertainment, business, science, technology, sports, movies, travel, jobs, education, health, environment, human-rights news and more.

See also
 List of newspapers in Bangladesh

References

External links
 Official website

Bengali-language newspapers published in Bangladesh
Daily newspapers published in Bangladesh
Newspapers published in Dhaka